Ghost 1.0 is a Metroidvania video game developed and published by Francisco "franfistro" Téllez de Meneses, the developer of Unepic, in collaboration with an unnamed development team. It was released on June 7, 2016 for the digital distribution platform Steam and later for GOG. It was released for the Xbox One and Nintendo Switch in July 2018 and for PlayStation 4 in April 2019.

The game received mostly positive reviews, that praised the game's visual style, story and action.

Gameplay 

The player starts as a gynoid known as the Chassis, which is being remote-controlled by a female, humanoid life-form known as Ghost. Ghost has the ability to use the Chassis as her physical body, and engage in combat by shooting enemies and using other weapons and techniques. She can also abandon the Chassis, leaving it defenseless and traveling the world as a virtual "ghost" to hack into other robots and take them over. This can be used to find secrets or to destroy other robots that would otherwise be dangerous. If the Chassis is destroyed, it is automatically replicated by super-fast 3D printer.

In typical Metroidvania fashion, the player is expected to explore the game world and collect various access cards and other items that will unlock the next area of the game. At certain points at the end of a level, the player must fight bosses to proceed. Certain rooms contain alarms that must be triggered, causing a gauntlet of enemies that can be fought repeatedly for more money (in the form of energy).

The player can unlock skills through the use of a skill tree. The player gains skill points based on how many access codes they have obtained, rather than by leveling up in the traditional sense by defeating enemies. However, the player can upgrade weapons in a more traditional manner.

The game also contains puzzle sections in the form of a laser-dodging minigame, where the player must possess one or more robots to make it past a laser grid that will destroy the robots on contact. An infiltration and rescue mission involving this towards the game's end can be skipped if the player so chooses.

Plot 
The game takes place in the future, and revolves around two intelligent but socially awkward cybercriminals, the roboticist Boogan (Jonathan Jones) and the hacker Jacker (Andrew Miller). The two of them desire to infiltrate the space station owned by the Nakamura Corporation, which is the world's largest and wealthiest producer of androids. They believe that Nakamura holds the source code for their highly intelligent androids, or "Nakas", within the station, since all the androids are controlled from a single server room. They find a contact named Viktor (Steven Kelly) who claims to have a number of freelance spies who work for him, and they hire one named "Ghost" (Mirisha Lottich) from him to sneak into the station via space elevator.

They tell Ghost to do whatever is necessary to capture the artificial intelligence code, believing they can sell it to the highest bidder and become rich. However, as Ghost shuts down various parts of the station, her behavior starts to become unusual. Boogan and Jacker begin to suspect that Ghost is actually a sentient AI that resides on the same server as the Nakas. They also discover that Nakamura is synthesizing organic compounds aboard the station for some reason.

To test their theory of Ghost being an AI, they cause a massive power fluctuation, which also causes Ghost to lose her connection. This proves them right, meanwhile, Viktor is angered that Boogan and Jacker are sabotaging his agents and sends a real human agent to destroy Ghost's chassis. Ghost narrowly escapes from Viktor's agent, but Viktor decides to target Jacker instead, kidnapping him and putting him deep underground to blackmail Boogan to stop.

Ghost leaves the station and goes with Boogan to rescue Jacker, successfully infiltrating the highly secured underground compound. She then returns to the station and accesses the server room. There, she realizes that all the "servers" were in fact human brains being fed nutrients by the station. Viktor attempts to kill her by destroying her disembodied brain, but one of the station's scientists saves her by putting her brain onto a robot with a force field. Ghost is then able to fight off waves of defense robots while Jacker defeats Viktor's hired hacker and manages to hide Ghost's brain forever by scrambling the entire database of the brains' serial numbers.

At the end of the story, it is revealed that Nakamura purchased a bankrupt cryonics company that had stored thousands of brains, revived them using technology they invented, and erased their memories to profit from using them to control robotic avatars through a brain-computer interface. Viktor was in on the plan and purchased some of the brains to use as powerful agents. All the Nakas are set free and given human rights, recognizing their status as cyborgs, while the CEO of Nakamura (Alex Jenks) is arrested. Ghost decides to join Boogan and Jacker as a permanent member of their team, much to their shock.

Prequel 
A retro-styled prequel to the game, entitled Mini Ghost, was released on April 28, 2017 for Windows. It features graphics styled after those of the MSX, and also includes a multiplayer mode.

Reception 
Ghost 1.0 was reviewed positively, with an aggregate score of 80/100 on Metacritic for the PC version of the game.

Ramon Nafria of Vandal Online rated the game 9/10, calling it "one of the best Metroidvanias we've played in the last few years".

David Jagneaux of Nintendo Life rated the game's Switch version 7/10, praising the gameplay mechanics as "subtle and clever". He also praised the game's world design as making internal sense and called the game's soundtrack "rocking". However, he criticized the game's story as "forgettable" with "cheesy", "cringe-inducing" humor.

References in other video games 
In unepic_fran's game UnMetal, the character Jacker of Ghost 1.0 calls the player character Jesse Fox by mistake, claiming there to be an issue with communication channels. Both Jacker and Jesse Fox are voiced by Andrew 'Noves' Miller. In addition, UnMetal players who own a copy of Ghost 1.0 in their Steam library will receive the Ghost 1.0 status on the main menu and unlock the GHOST'S DRONE special item which can be retrieved from a crate in Chapter 3.

References 

2016 video games
Android (robot) video games
Cyberpunk video games
Metroidvania games
Nintendo Switch games
PlayStation 4 games
Science fiction video games
Single-player video games
Video games about crime
Video games about cyborgs
Video games about spirit possession
Video games developed in Spain
Video games featuring female protagonists
Video games set in outer space
Wii U eShop games
Windows games
Xbox One games